Nhất Chi Mai (February 20, 1934 – May 16, 1967), born Phan Thị Mai and legally named Thích nữ Diệu Huỳnh, was a Buddhist nun who killed herself in an act of self-immolation in Saigon on May 16, 1967, in protest at the Vietnam War.

Early life
Nhat was born on February 20, 1934, in the Thai Hiep Thanh commune in the province of Tay Ninh. In 1956 she graduated from the National Teacher's School. In 1964 she graduated from the University of Saigon Faculty of Letters, and in 1966 she graduated from the Van Hanh Buddhist University.

Career

She became an elementary school teacher at Tan Dinh in Saigon after graduation. While in Saigon, she actively participated in the group "Youth Serving Society" and taught within various orphanages. During this time she was a student of Thich Nhat Hanh and was deeply influenced by his vision of Engaged Buddhism. 

Along with Sister Chan Khong she was one of the first six lay people ordained in Nhat Hanh's Buddhist order, the Order of Interbeing in February 1966.

Self-immolation
On May 16, 1967, at 7:20 a.m., in District 10 of Saigon/Ho Chi Minh City in front of the Tu Nghiem Pagoda, Nhat Chi Mai lit herself on fire using a petrol accelerant. She was 33 years old when she died from her burns. Prior to her self-immolation she wrote ten messages outlining her anti-war beliefs and calling for an end to the Vietnam War.

See also

 Chân Không
 Vietnam War
 List of political self-immolations

References

Further reading
 Chan Khong, Sister. (2007). Learning True Love. Berkeley: Parallax Press. See especially chapter 8, "Sister Mai," pp. 163–183.
 King, Sallie B. (2000).  They Who Burned Themselves for Peace: Quaker and Buddhist Self-Immolators during the Vietnam War, Buddhist-Christian Studies 20, 127–150 
 Nhat Hanh, Thich. (1993). "The Path of the Return Continues the Journey" in Love in Action: Writings on Nonviolent Social Change. Berkeley: Parallax Press. pp. 12–37.
 Nhat Hanh, Thich & Daniel Berrigan. (2001). The Raft is not the Shore. Maryknoll (NY): Orbis Books. Especially the chapter on self-immolation pp. 63–73.

External links
 Tưởng Niệm Thánh Tử Đạo Nhất Chi Mai (photo)

1934 births
1967 suicides
Suicides by self-immolation
Suicides in Vietnam
1967 in Vietnam
Self-immolations by Buddhists
Vietnamese Buddhist nuns
20th-century Buddhist nuns
Buddhist martyrs